Anzina is a genus of lichenized fungi of uncertain familial and ordinal classification in the subclass Ostropomycetidae. It is a monotypic genus, containing the single species Anzina carneonivea. This lichen was first described by Italian botanist Martino Anzi in 1868, as Gyalolechia carneonivea. German lichenologist Christoph Scheidegger circumscribed the genus Anzina in 1982.

References

Lecanoromycetes
Lichen genera
Monotypic Lecanoromycetes genera
Taxa described in 1982